Marc Thompson (born May 20, 1975) is an American voice actor who has worked for Konami Cross Media NY, NYAV Post and DuArt Film and Video. Some of his major roles include Kevin Thompson, Anthony DeMartino, Timothy O'Neill in Daria. He is notable for voicing the titular character in Robocar Poli. He voices Casey Jones in the 2003 version of the Teenage Mutant Ninja Turtles cartoons and video games; and is also the voice of Tepig, Primeape, Gliscor, Krookodile, and Gengar in the Pokémon television series. He is the narrator of numerous Star Wars audio books including the Legacy of the Force and Fate of the Jedi series. He earned his BFA from New York University's Tisch School of the Arts in 1997.

Filmography

Film

Animation

Anime

Video games

Audio books

References

Bibliography

External links
  

 
 

Living people
Audiobook narrators
American male voice actors
American male video game actors
American male stage actors
Male actors from New York (state)
People from Webster, New York
Tisch School of the Arts alumni
Ministers of the Churches of Christ
20th-century American male actors
21st-century American male actors
1975 births